William McNab (1870 – unknown) was a Scottish professional association footballer who played as a centre forward.

At representative level, he played once for the Scottish Football Alliance XI against the rival Scottish Football League in 1892, while with Northern.

He made no appearances for Clapton Orient after his brief time with Arsenal.

References

1870 births
Year of death unknown
Footballers from Glasgow
Scottish footballers
Association football forwards
Northern F.C. players
Burnley F.C. players
Arsenal F.C. players
English Football League players
Leyton Orient F.C. players